KUER-FM (90.1 MHz) is a public radio station in Salt Lake City, Utah. Owned by the University of Utah, its studios are located in the Eccles Broadcast Center on the University of Utah campus, while its transmitter is located on Farnsworth Peak, after relocating from Mount Vision in the Oquirrh Mountains in 2011.

The station primarily carries National Public Radio programming and other syndicated content distributed by Public Radio International and American Public Media. It is also the producer of RadioWest, a local news discussion program focusing on Utah and the Western United States.

KUER broadcasts in HD Radio; its second subchannel carries the BBC World Service, while its third channel carries classical music from American Public Media's Classical 24 service.

History
KUER debuted on June 5, 1960. Originally, it broadcast at only 250 watts and wasn't available away from the University of Utah campus. It gradually expanded its signal to 35,000 watts. The station was a charter member of NPR and was one of the stations that carried the initial broadcast of All Things Considered.

On October 18, 2022, translator K298BE dropped its simulcast of KUER-FM, and changed it to a simulcast of the HD2 subchannel of KBSS.

Repeaters
There are five full-powered FM stations in several locations throughout Utah.

KUER has a 10-watt booster in the town of Alta providing coverage there as the main transmitter is shielded by terrain. It also has a second 1,000 watt booster on Lewis Peak, providing coverage to the Park City area.

Translators
KUER-FM operates one of the largest translator networks of any NPR station in the country, consisting of 33 translators.

References

External links

NPR member stations
UER-FM
Mass media in Salt Lake City
University of Utah
1960 establishments in Utah
Radio stations established in 1960